Leptobos is an extinct genus of large bovine, known from the Late Pliocene and Early Pleistocene of Eurasia, extending from the Iberian Peninsula to northern China. Species of Leptobos reached a weight up to 320 kg. Leptobos  is considered to be closely related to the insular genus Epileptobos from the Pleistocene of Java, and is considered to be ancestral to Bison. The dietary preference across the genus includes species that were browsers, grazers and mixed feeders (both browsing and grazing). The first appearance of Leptobos in Europe around 3.6-3.5 million years ago is considered to define the beginning of the Villafranchian European faunal stage. Leptobos became extinct after being replaced by their descendant Bison during the Early Pleistocene, after a period of temporal overlap. "Leptobos" syrticus from Libya likely belongs in a different genus.

Species 

 Leptobos brevicornis (China)
 Leptobos crassus (China)
 Leptobos falconeri (Pakistan)
 Leptobos stenometopon (France and Italy)
 Leptobos merlai (France and Italy)
 Leptobos furtivus (France also possibly Italy)
 Leptobos etruscus (France, Italy, and Spain)
 Leptobos vallisarni (Italy and China)

References

External links
http://www.helsinki.fi/~mhaaramo/metazoa/deuterostoma/chordata/synapsida/eutheria/artiodactyla/bovioidea/boselaphini.html
http://paleodb.org/cgi-bin/bridge.pl

Prehistoric bovids
Pleistocene even-toed ungulates
Fossil taxa described in 1878
Prehistoric even-toed ungulate genera